Dewey Michael Proctor (July 1, 1920 – July 2, 2009) was an American football fullback.

Proctor was born in South Carolina in 1920 and attended Lake View High School in Lake View, South Carolina. He played college football at Furman. 

He played professional football in the All-America Football Conference for the New York Yankees in 1946, 1947, and 1949 and for the Chicago Rockets in 1948. He appeared in 25 professional football games, five of them as a starter, and tallied 280 rushing yards, 54 receiving yards, and four touchdowns. 

He died in 2009.

References

1920 births
2009 deaths
American football fullbacks
New York Yankees (AAFC) players
Chicago Rockets players
Furman Paladins football players
Players of American football from South Carolina